The women's 5000 metres event at the 2013 Summer Universiade was held on 11 July. The original winner, Roxana Bârcă, tested positive for a prohibited substance after the competition and was subsequently disqualified.

Results

References 
Results (original)
Results (updated)

5000
2013 in women's athletics
2013